Roman Ignatov (born 11 June 1973) is a retired Russian professional footballer.

1973 births
Living people
Russian footballers
Russian Premier League players
Russian expatriate footballers
Expatriate footballers in Finland
FC Zenit Saint Petersburg players
Association football midfielders
FC Dynamo Saint Petersburg players